John Jones (born April 4, 1975 in Cleveland, Ohio) is a former professional American football tight end in the National Football League. He attended the University of Pittsburgh. He would play tight end with the Baltimore Ravens from 2000 to 2003.

External links
Pro-Football reference

1975 births
Living people
Players of American football from Cleveland
Baltimore Ravens players
Pittsburgh Panthers football players